German submarine U-392 was a Type VIIC U-boat of Nazi Germany's Kriegsmarine during World War II. She carried out two patrols. She did not sink or damage any ships. She was sunk by US aircraft and British warships in the Strait of Gibraltar on 16 March 1944.

Design
German Type VIIC submarines were preceded by the shorter Type VIIB submarines. U-392 had a displacement of  when at the surface and  while submerged. She had two shafts and two  propellers.

U-392 was fitted with five  torpedo tubes (four fitted at the bow and one at the stern), fourteen torpedoes, one  SK C/35 naval gun, 220 rounds, and two twin  C/30 anti-aircraft guns. The boat had a complement of between forty-four and sixty.

Service history
The submarine was laid down on 10 January 1942 at the Howaldtswerke (yard) at Flensburg as yard number 24, launched on 10 April 1943 and commissioned on 29 May under the command of Oberleutnant zur See Henning Schümann.

The boat was a member of five wolfpacks.

She served with the 5th U-boat Flotilla from 29 May 1943 and the 1st flotilla from 1 December of the same year.

First patrol
The boat departed Kiel on 2 December 1943. She passed through the gap that separates Iceland and the Faroe Islands, turned about and headed northeast of Iceland; she then turned about once more and made for the northern Atlantic Ocean. She docked in Brest in occupied France on 20 January 1944.

Second patrol and loss
U-392 had departed Brest on 29 February 1944, heading south. On 16 March, she was attacked and sunk by depth charges from three US PBY Catalinas, the British frigate  and the British destroyer  in the Strait of Gibraltar.

52 men died in the U-boat; there were no survivors.

Wolfpacks
U-392 took part in five wolfpacks, namely:
 Coronel 1 (15 – 17 December 1943)
 Amrum (18 – 23 December 1943)
 Rügen 4 (23 December 1943 – 2 January 1944)
 Rügen 3 (2 – 7 January 1944)
 Rügen (7 – 11 January 1944)

References

Bibliography

External links

German Type VIIC submarines
U-boats commissioned in 1943
U-boats sunk in 1944
U-boats sunk by British warships
U-boats sunk by US aircraft
U-boats sunk by depth charges
1943 ships
Ships built in Kiel
Ships lost with all hands
World War II submarines of Germany
World War II shipwrecks in the Mediterranean Sea
Maritime incidents in March 1944